The 1955–56 Greek Football Cup was the 14th edition of the Greek Football Cup. The competition culminated with the Greek Cup Final, held at Leoforos Alexandras Stadium, Athens on 24 June 1956. The match was contested by AEK Athens and Olympiacos, with AEK Athens winning by 2–1.

Calendar
From Round of 32 onwards:

Knockout phase
In the knockout phase, teams play against each other over a single match. If the match ends up as a draw, extra time will be played and if the match remains a draw a replay match is set at the home of the guest team which the extra time rule stands as well. If a winner doesn't occur after the replay match the winner emerges by a flip of a coin.

Bracket

Round of 16

|}

Quarter-finals

||colspan="2" rowspan="3" 

|}

Semi-finals

|}

Final

The 14th Greek Cup Final was played at the Leoforos Alexandras Stadium.

References

External links
Greek Cup 1955-56 at RSSSF

Greek Football Cup seasons
Greek Cup
Cup